Musaler is a village in the Armavir Province of Armenia. The village was renamed in 1972 after Musa Ler, the site of Armenian resistance in 1915.

Harisa Festival 
Every mid-September, people gather near the memorial of the Musa Dagh resistance in Musaler to participate in the Harisa festival that aims to celebrate the resistance that took place in 1915. During the festival, volunteers cook harisa, traditional Armenian food that is said to be cooked by Armenian refugees during the 40 days of resistance on Musa Dagh.

Gallery

See also 
Armavir Province

References

World Gazeteer: Armenia – World-Gazetteer.com

Populated places in Armavir Province